John Christie may refer to:

Sport
 John Christie (footballer, born 1881) (1881–1934), Scottish footballer
 John Christie (footballer, born 1929) (1929–2014), Scottish football goalkeeper who played for Southampton
 Jack Christie (born 1926), Scottish international lawn bowler

Others
 John Christie (artist) (born 1945), British artist and film-maker
 John Christie (headmaster) (1899–1980), headmaster of Repton School and Westminster School, Principal of Jesus College, Oxford
 John Christie (industrialist) (1774–1858), industrialist born in Scotland
 J. Walter Christie (1865–1944), American inventor
 John Alexander Christie (1895–1967), British Victoria Cross recipient
 John Christie (landowner) (1824–1902), Scottish industrialist, arboriculturalist and landowner
 John Christie (mayor) (1883–1953), Scottish-born South African politician
 John Christie (minister) (born 1947), Moderator of the General Assembly of the Church of Scotland for 2010–2011
 John Christie (opera manager) (1882–1962), opera festival founder
 John Christie (serial killer) (1899–1953), British serial killer
 John H. Christie (1878–1960), American architect

See also
 John Christy, American climate scientist
 Jonathan Christie (born 1983), Scottish field hockey player